Je suis le seigneur du château (English: I'm the King of the Castle) is a 1989 French drama film, directed by Régis Wargnier, loosely based on the 1970 novel I'm the King of the Castle by the English writer Susan Hill.

Plot

The film stars Régis Arpin as 10-year-old Thomas, the son of a millionaire. Together, they live a fairly isolated existence, in a mansion in rural France. The maid's son, Charles (David Behar) moves in as well, and the two parents hope that the two can become friends; they become enemies immediately after meeting each other. Once their parents fall in love, Thomas decides to make Charles, whom he views as an "invader", as miserable as possible.

Je suis le seigneur du château might be compared by some to the Macaulay Culkin film The Good Son, with its similar storyline. However, whereas Culkin's character is psychotic, Arpin's character's actions attempt to serve a purpose. The movie was recently repacked with La Femme de ma vie in a 2-DVD set.

Notes
The film was shot at the chateau de Beaumanoir in the Côtes-d'Armor, in the Le Leslay commune. One sees also the countryside of the Huelgoat region and the town of Morlaix (the viaduct and the little streets around the church Saint-Melanie). The film was shot just a few months after the storm of 1987 of which there is visual evidence in the film.

The film deviates from the novel in several key ways. Most notably, it imbues a homoerotic subtext in the relationship between Thomas and Charles. In the book, Thomas (named Edmund) and Charles fluctuate between being friends and enemies, but there are never any suggestions of romance between the two.

References

External links
 

1989 films
Films based on British novels
Films directed by Régis Wargnier
 Films set in country houses
Films set in France
French drama films
1980s French films